Loren James Toews (born November 3, 1951) is a retired NFL football player.

Toews graduated from Del Mar High School in San Jose, California and later University of California, Berkeley where he received his degree in biological sciences.  In 1972, Toews was named the "most inspirational player" on the team at Berkeley and given the Stub Allison Award, named after California football coach Leonard B. "Stub" Allison.

That following year, in 1973 Toews was drafted in the eighth round by the Pittsburgh Steelers where he played as a linebacker for 11 seasons.  While playing for the Steelers, Toews attended the University of Pittsburgh's Graduate School of Business and obtained his MBA degree in 1981.

Toews was a four-time Super Bowl participant and a four-time winner. He started in Super Bowl XIII. In Super Bowl IX, though, he replaced an injured Andy Russell for most of the second half. As an accomplished linebacker, he was able to contribute to the win. Toews moved to left inside linebacker in 1982 when the Steelers switched to the 3–4 defense, while incumbent middle linebacker Jack Lambert moved to right inside linebacker and retained the "Mike" role as the Steelers signal-caller on defense.

Toews retired from professional football at spring camp in 1984 having played in 57 consecutive games up to the last game of the previous season.

Toews has a wife, Valerie and is also the father of three children: Aaron, Jocelyn and Cassandra. Aaron was a defenseman on the Northeastern University hockey team from 1996-1998.  Jocelyn owns an independent record label called Lujo Records.

Toews lives in the San Francisco Bay Area where he and his younger brother Jeff (who also played in the NFL as an offensive lineman) buy and sell Real Estate.

References

1951 births
American football linebackers
California Golden Bears football players
Living people
People from Dinuba, California
Pittsburgh Steelers players
Del Mar High School alumni
Players of American football from San Jose, California